Falcon 9 flight 26 was the 26th Falcon 9 space launch by SpaceX, which launched both ABS's ABS-2A and Eutelsat's Eutelsat 117 West B (formerly Satmex 9) to geostationary transfer orbit, that occurred on 15 June 2016 at 14:29 UTC (10:29am local time). 

After the launch, the first stage of the Falcon 9 experienced a hard landing and failed to land successfully on the deck of the droneship Of Course I Still Love You in the Atlantic Ocean. The landing failed due to low thrust on one of the three engines during the landing burn; as the rocket stage was about to land on the deck, the engines ran out of oxidizer.

See also
Flight 26's first-stage landing test 
List of Falcon 9 launches

References

External links

2016 in spaceflight
Falcon 9
2016 in Florida
Rocket launches in 2016